The Valdemar Legacy is a 2010 Spanish pastiche horror film directed and written by José Luis Alemán which stars Laia Marull, Daniele Liotti, Paul Naschy, Silvia Abascal, Ana Risueño and Óscar Jaenada, among others. Ending with an unresolved plot, it is followed by The Valdemar Legacy II: The Forbidden Shadow. While drawing from the Cthulhu Mythos, the plot does not closely adapt a particular Lovecraftian story. It was panned by critics.

Plot 
Set in two different timelines, the plot uses an extensive analepsis to the 19th century. The film ends abruptly with a cliffhanger, only focusing on the flashback subplot pertaining the tragedy of the Valdemar couple (Lázaro and Leonor) circa 1880, thus leaving the plot not set in the past forgotten as a sort of disconnected preface.

Cast

Production 
The film was produced by La Cruzada Entertainment SL. Shooting locations included Comillas, Azpeitia, Valporquero and La Granjilla.

Release 
The film was theatrically released in Spain on 22 January 2010.

Reception 
Reviews were generally negative, citing the mediocrity of the film. In the wake of the appalling reception, the director wrote a letter apologizing for splitting the film into two parts and pointing out that the overacting of the actors was done on purpose to seek the essence of classic horror films.

Javier Ocaña of El País considered that the narrative structure of The Valdemar Legacy made no sense, also assessing that, in too many sequences, "it looks like a film with professional means commanded by an amateur".

Irene Crespo of Cinemanía rated the film 2½ out of 5 stars, deeming it to be "tremendously risky".

Manuel J. Lombardo of Diario de Sevilla considered the film to be a double disappointment for the viewer, because of the low quality and also because of the obligation of having to go to the theatre again to find out how the thing ends, dragged by failures such as an "absolute inability to narrate", "no sense of rhythm or ellipsis", a "very poor mise-en-scène", a null sense of atmosphere or horror, as well as "lamentable performances" and "second-rate digital effects".

See also 
 List of Spanish films of 2010

References

External links 
 The Valdemar Legacy at ICAA's Catálogo de Cinespañol

Spanish horror films
2010 horror films
2010 films
2010s Spanish-language films
Films set in the 19th century
Films shot in Spain
Films shot in Cantabria
2010s Spanish films